Shawnee Mission  is a region of northern Johnson County, Kansas, part of the Kansas City metropolitan area in the United States. Since August 1, 1960, the United States Postal Service has used the name to denote a large postal coverage area (ZIP Codes 662xx) at the northeastern tip of Johnson County. It contains numerous towns, and the name was created to structure management of the post offices located therein. Effectively, these towns' post offices are subsidiaries of the Shawnee Mission Main Post Office in Mission, Kansas. Properly, a mailing address may indicate the delivery "place" as either Shawnee Mission, or the actual town name, and be treated the same.

The following towns are included in the postal area known as Shawnee Mission:

 Countryside (Incorporated into the City of Mission in January, 2003)
 Fairway
 Lake Quivira (the northern part is in Wyandotte County, Kansas)
 Leawood
 Lenexa
 Merriam
 Mission
 Mission Hills
 Mission Woods
 Overland Park (except some southern parts)
 Prairie Village
 Roeland Park
 Shawnee
 Stanley (unincorporated)
 Westwood
 Westwood Hills

Parts of southern Overland Park are not part of Shawnee Mission, as they were later annexed from the town of Stillwell which was already covered by ZIP Code 66085. Additionally, delivery to the eastern edge of Overland Park was assigned to the Post Office in Prairie Village, with ZIP Code 66208, and the Prairie Village post office was not managed under the Shawnee Mission designation until 2012.

History

The name Shawnee Mission derives from the Shawnee Methodist Mission, a mission to the Shawnee tribe, founded in 1830 in present-day Wyandotte County, Kansas by the Methodist church.  The mission was moved to what is now Johnson County in 1839.  Shawnee Mission subsequently became a local, informal designation for the region surrounding the actual mission, especially before the development, expansion and conjoint boundarying of the various towns in northeast Johnson County.  The Shawnee Mission School District and Blue Valley School District encompass most of the area.

Shawnee Mission is part of the Kansas City Metropolitan Area. If the independent cities that constitute Shawnee Mission were to incorporate into a single municipality, its 2015 population estimate would be 402,662 (up from 325,147 in 2000), and would surpass Wichita as the largest city in Kansas.

References

External links
 Shawnee Indian Mission

1839 establishments in the United States
Geography of Johnson County, Kansas
Kansas City metropolitan area